Alice Bowe is an English garden designer and columnist for The Times.

Bowe grew up in Dorking, Surrey before moving to the small village of Osgathorpe in Leicestershire at the age of 9.

After schooling at Loughborough High School in the East Midlands, Bowe trained in fine art at the Ruskin, Oxford University. She completed graduate studies in garden design and landscape architecture at the Oxford College of Garden Design.

Bowe was the winner of the BT Essence of an Entrepreneur award 2006 and a finalist in the Young Entrepreneur of the Year category at the Startups Awards in 2005.

Bowe features as a presenter on the BBC's RHS Chelsea Flower Show 2009 website.

References

External links 
 Official homepage
 BBC Chelsea Flower Show Presenters Page

The Times people
Living people
English landscape architects
People from Dorking
1980 births
People educated at Loughborough High School
Alumni of the Ruskin School of Art
British women columnists
English women writers